The American sitcom Two and a Half Men, created and executive produced by Chuck Lorre and Lee Aronsohn, premiered on CBS on September 22, 2003. The show initially centers on seven characters: brothers Charlie and Alan Harper; Jake Harper, the son of Alan and his first ex-wife; Judith Harper-Melnick, Alan's first ex-wife, Herb's ex-wife, and Jake and Milly's mother; Rose, one of Charlie's previous one night stands who continuously stalks him; Evelyn Harper, Charlie and Alan's wealthy, five time widowed, bisexual mother, and Jake's grandmother; and last of all, Berta, Charlie's sharp-tongued housekeeper, who later joins the main cast starting with season two after playing a major recurring role throughout the first season. In season nine, the show is revamped when Charlie is struck and killed by a moving train. Walden Schmidt replaces him as the new owner of the beach house, a recently divorced internet billionaire. In season eleven, Jake moves to Japan and leaves the series, so to replace "the half-man", Charlie's long-lost-daughter moves into the beach house after looking for her late father.

Over time, several supporting characters have been promoted to starring roles: Berta (season 1 recurring; season 2–12 regular), Charlie and Alan's (and later Walden's) sharp-tongued housekeeper; Kandi (season 3 recurring; season 4 regular; season 10 guest), one of Charlie's former one night stands, and later on, Alan's second ex-wife; Chelsea (season 6 recurring; season 7 regular; season 9 guest), Charlie's second most notable love interest (after Rose), and ex-fiancée; Walden Schmidt (season 9–12), an internet billionaire who buys Charlie's beach house after his death; Jenny (season 11–12), Charlie's illegitimate daughter from a one-night stand twenty years before; last of all, Louis (season 12), the 6-year-old boy that Walden decides to adopt. The show also features numerous supporting characters, each of whom plays a prominent role in a small group of episodes.

Main characters 

Legend
 = Main cast (credited)
 = Recurring cast (actor appears in three or more episodes that season)
 = Guest cast (actor appears in two or fewer episodes that season)

Notes

Charlie Harper 

Charles Francis "Charlie" Harper (Charlie Sheen, Seasons 1–8; Kathy Bates, Season 9) is the series' original central character. He is a womanizing bachelor who tended to abuse his younger brother Alan, whom he loved dearly, although he would have never admitted it, and usually took pleasure in any misfortune or trouble he runs into. Charlie was a jingle writer and a children's music performer under the name Charlie Waffles. Charlie spent his days partying, sleeping, gambling, drinking alcohol, womanizing and wearing bowling shirts. He had many major serious romantic relationships, one was with his stalker, Rose, a ballerina and dance teacher named Mia, and Chelsea.  He was the opposite of Alan: wealthy, confident, and charismatic. He gave his nephew, Jake, advice (much of which is not age-appropriate), but the two increasingly traded barbs as well. 

Charlie is killed sometime between seasons 8 and 9 as he is hit by a train and it is revealed that he had proposed marriage to Rose before his death. While Alan is in the hospital, Charlie's ghost appears to him (It is implied that this is due to a hallucinogenic reaction due to the medication Alan was on.) and explains that his spirit now lives on in Hell forced to live eternally in a woman's body (Kathy Bates) as punishment for his womanizing behavior during his lifetime. He acts as his brother's spirit guide, though he later confessed that he really could not care less about what he does. Before returning to the afterlife, Charlie tries to reveal himself to Jake but fails. As a result of retroactive continuity, the series finale reveals that Charlie never died but has been held captive by Rose in a basement pit under her house in Sherman Oaks. He escapes, collects $2.5 million in royalty money from his children's songs, and sends Alan, Evelyn and Walden, who Rose has told him about, texts and emails promising revenge while also sending large checks to his former romantic interests, Jenny, and Jake. However, as he is about to enter the beach house a grand piano being transported to the house by helicopter falls on him, killing him thus ending the show.

Alan Harper 

Dr. Alan Jerome Harper (Jon Cryer, Seasons 1–12), Charlie's younger brother by 2 years, is well-meaning, but continuously makes poor choices and mistakes, while also being bullied by Charlie, Berta and Judith. He and his ex-wife, Judith, are Jake's parents, and Alan is possibly the biological father of Judith's second child, a daughter named Millie Melnick. After losing his house to Judith in the divorce, he moves in with Charlie. He is generally a pleasant and supportive man, but seems to have an attraction to women who treat him poorly, which may stem from the non-nurturing relationship he had with his and Charlie's mother. In the season 4 episode, "Repeated Blows to His Unformed Head", it is revealed that Alan has a pregnancy fetish, which he says is due to Judith only varying from her sexless marriage policy while pregnant with Jake. Also, in the Season 6 episode, "She'll Still Be Dead at Halftime", he confesses that he likes feet (see foot fetish). In the season 3 finale, Alan marries a twenty-two-year-old dumbbell named Kandi who was one of Charlie's former girlfriends. After Charlie had canceled his wedding with Mia, Alan and Kandi got married instead. Although in the season 4 premiere, four months after the marriage Kandi throws Alan out of her condo and divorces Alan which leads him to paying alimony to two ex-wives.

In season six, Alan starts his first serious relationship since his second divorce. Alan starts dating his receptionist, Melissa. The relationship gets serious when Melissa has Alan move in with her and her mother, but their happiness is short lived when Melissa's mother gets Alan high on brownies and seduces him. Melissa walks in on them, but Alan is too high to explain what happened. Melissa breaks up with Alan and kicks him out. In the season six finale, while Judith is giving birth to what is possibly Alan's daughter, Alan and Melissa meet up and have sex in a closet, ultimately getting back together. Their relationship goes into season seven where Melissa wants to move into the beach house with Alan, Charlie, and Chelsea. Alan is happy to live with Melissa at first, but eventually Melissa and Chelsea start taking over the house, resulting in Alan and Charlie staying at a hotel. Alan and Charlie call Evelyn to fix everything. Evelyn tells Chelsea about Melissa's short lived romance resulting in the girls getting into a fight, and Melissa moving out. Alan and Melissa are now forced to have sex in their car since Melissa won't let Alan see her mother at her house, and Melissa doesn't want to see Chelsea at Alan's house. Melissa tells Alan to get his own house, so Alan steals the keys to a house Evelyn is selling, and lies to Melissa, saying that it's his. When Alan and Melissa get caught, they sneak out the window, but the cops find Alan in nothing but his briefs and when he tries to explain what happened, he turns to Melissa only to find she's gone.

Towards the end of season seven, Alan starts dating Lyndsey McElroy, the mother of Jake's friend, Eldridge, and Judith's neighbor. Alan and Lyndsey date for the last three episodes of the seventh season, and their relationship goes into season eight. Lyndsey and Alan get serious and Lyndsey has Alan move in with her. After moving in, Alan goes to the liquor store where he runs into his ex-girlfriend, Melissa. Alan and Melissa start an affair, but the affair is short lived when he decides to move on from Melissa and continue his relationship with Lyndsey. At Lyndsey's house, Alan smokes a pipe which Lynsey finds sexy. Lyndsey takes Alan upstairs to have sex, but Alan didn't realize he put the pipe down while it was still lit, resulting in him burning down Lyndsey's house. Lyndsey stays mad at Alan for most of the next episode, but when she finally forgives him, her ex-husband Chris steps in and makes up with Lyndsey, leaving Alan brokenhearted and alone again. Several episodes later, Lyndsey breaks up with her ex-husband when she realizes she's lost feelings for him. Alan and Lyndsey get back together, and date for rest of the eighth season.

Walden Schmidt purchases the beach house and lets Alan temporarily stay after Alan helps Walden accept the end of his marriage to Bridget. Walden later insists that Alan stay with him permanently when Alan, with Bridget's help, saves him from Courtney (Jenny McCarthy), a femme fatale who previously had a relationship with Charlie, and was out to get Walden's money. Alan and Walden became best friends after that. This friendship eventually earned Alan a position as a board member of Walden's company and his name on the deed of the beach house. Walden also renamed his company "Walden Loves Alan Enterprises" in honor of his best friend. Alan continues his romance with Lyndsey during season nine, only for her to break up with him again after she finds out about all of his lies.

While Walden is dating Zoey, Zoey sees right through Alan and knows that he is sponging off Walden. Walden and Zoey go on a date one night and reluctantly take Alan with them. At dinner, Alan sees his ex-girlfriend Lyndsey. Alan and Lyndsey reconcile at the end of the episode. Alan dates Lyndsey throughout the rest of season nine, and reveals to Jake that he and Lyndsey have no intention of getting married.

In season ten, Walden starts to grow tired of Alan living with him, but nevertheless allows him to sponge off of him for money. Alan and Lyndsey continue their relationship, but Lyndsey starts to fantasize about other people when seeing Alan. In "Something My Gynecologist Said", Lyndsey asks Alan for a commitment since her gynecologist asked her out. Alan is reluctant, resulting in Lyndsey breaking up with him again. That night, Alan goes over to Lyndsey's house and proposes to her. Alan tells her that as soon as he has enough money, he'll put a deposit down on a ring.

Not too long after getting engaged, Alan gets an email from his second ex-wife, Kandi who's in town and wants to get coffee. Kandi tries getting back together with Alan, but he refuses due to his relationship with Lyndsey. Towards the end of season ten, Lyndsey breaks up with Alan after she feels like all the spark in their relationship is gone.

In the final episode, Alan tries to take the $2.5 million in back royalties from Charlie and ends up fleeing from a very angry dungeon escapee (Charlie). Finally he is back as always living at the beach house since Lyndsey doesn't appear to be marrying him.

Jake Harper 
Jacob David "Jake" Harper (born March 14, 1993) (Angus T. Jones, Seasons 1–10; main, Season 12; guest; while E. G. Daily provided the singing voice for Jake in the opening and closing theme songs of seasons 1–8, and the first two episodes of season 9) is the son of Alan and Judith who spends most of his free time playing video games, watching movies and television, eating, playing the electric guitar, and sleeping. He is also an excellent player of card games, notably poker, and but is very naïve and absent-minded, which coupled with his flatulence problem, is a frequent theme of jokes about him. Despite his apparent lack of intelligence, he is sometimes very observant. He is friendly, laid-back, and he clearly loves his father and uncle. However, he blamed his parents divorce on Alan for many years and is unafraid of rebelling against him, showing favoritism towards Charlie in such matters, but it was only after he enlisted that he realized that Judith had more to do with the divorce than he had originally thought. Jake's style, personality and attitude changes as the series progresses, from a more cute, little-boy charm in the first season to a sardonic teenager in later seasons. After Charlie's death, Jake at first does not show any emotion but it is later revealed that, like Alan, he painfully misses him and still grieves his death (though not as bad as Alan). He proceeds to tell his father that the most important thing Charlie taught him was that when he is his uncle's age he wants to be married and have a family, because Charlie seemed very lonely and unhappy. Despite his young age, he has proven himself to be charming enough to get sex from older women (as evidenced in seasons 9 and 10). Jake and Eldridge decide to join the Army following their high school graduation. Jake forms a friendship with Walden, who buys the beach house, and has such an impact on his life he tells Walden that he would name his child with his then girlfriend Tammy, Walden Harper. At the end of the tenth season he announces to the household that he is being shipped to Japan for a year. He and Alan go on a father-son bonding trip together (one that he wanted Walden to come on) before he leaves.

Though mentioned often, Jake is absent throughout all of season 11, and is also featured (via archive footage) in a montage paying tribute to him in the fifth episode of season 12.

Angus T. Jones makes a cameo appearance reprising his role in the second half of the series finale in season 12, "Of Course He's Dead". Jake is passing through town and pays a visit to Alan and Walden, informing them that he is no longer in the army and has married a Japanese dancer, and is the stepfather to her two children. He also mentions that Charlie (who is revealed to still be alive) sent him a check for $250,000 along with a note that simply states "I'm alive". Upon learning that Charlie is on the loose and is out to kill Alan and Walden, a scared Jake bids Alan, Walden, and Berta goodbye as he immediately leaves the beach house for the final time. Both his entrance and exit are followed by a long studio applause.

Walden Schmidt 

Walden Schmidt (Ashton Kutcher, Seasons 9–12) is a billionaire internet entrepreneur who has recently been divorced and was suicidal when Alan first met him. When Charlie supposedly dies and leaves the house to Alan, Alan puts the house on the market because he is unable to make payments on the three mortgages. Guest stars John Stamos, Jenna Elfman and Thomas Gibson view the house but do not buy it. While Alan is speaking to Charlie's ashes and trying to decide where to spread them, Walden appears from nowhere on the back deck, scaring Alan and causing him to drop the ashes across the living room floor. Once inside, he reveals that he was trying to drown himself in the ocean, having been recently divorced from his wife Bridget, portrayed by Judy Greer. He and Alan bond at Pavlov's bar, where he tells Alan that he made his $1.3 billion fortune by selling his website to Microsoft. After picking up two women and bringing them back to the house, where he sleeps with them, he decides to buy the house.

His wife describes him as shy and emotionally immature, which upsets him, so, with Alan's help, he returns to his mansion to confront his wife in the hope of reconciling. However, he is sent away after being treated for an electric shock that he received while climbing the front gates of the mansion. Walden gets a second chance when Bridget later decides that she had been too harsh and that he deserves a chance to prove he is not as childish as he was; this chance is quickly ruined by a food fight between Walden and a little girl in the middle of Soup Plantation. Walden eventually invites Alan and Jake to continue living at the house they have been living in for 8 years with him as Walden wants someone around he can trust, and they became best friends. Despite his frequent shyness, Walden walks around the house naked, and is often barefoot. He drives a Fisker Karma, and asks Evelyn to remodel the house using solar power and wind power.

Walden starts dating a British woman named Zoey (Sophie Winkleman) whom he met at the supermarket. Bridget later comes wanting Walden back but he declines her wanting Zoey instead. She later is seen stalking him where she runs into Rose who says she can help make Walden suffer. Bridget reluctantly goes with her. Walden was introduced with a beard and long, greasy hair, but when he started to get serious with Zoey, he decided to cut his hair and shave. Walden has also matured a great deal by spending time with Alan and dating Zoey. Though he still considers Alan his best friend, he eventually became aware that Alan is a freeloader and now understands what Charlie had to put up with. In season ten, Walden proposes to Zoey but she turns him down, and leaves him for another man. He starts dating Charlie's former stalker Rose, but Zoey tries to reconcile with Walden, telling him she made a mistake. When Walden tells Rose that they're going to have to break up. Rose acts like she is okay with it at first, but after leaving, she sends two ferrets to attack Walden. Rose goes to Zoey's apartment wearing a pregnancy harness and tells Zoey that Walden got her pregnant. Zoey breaks up with Walden for good once more without letting him explain himself.

Later in the season, Walden takes the alias of Sam Wilson and pretends to be a regular, average guy so he can find someone who isn't after his money. Walden meets Kate (Brooke D'Orsay), and tells her that he lives with billionaire, Alan Harper. Kate invites Walden to be her roommate, and they ultimately start dating. Walden keeps the lie going for several episodes until he wants to help Kate set up a fashion line of clothes she designed. Walden put US$100,000 in Alan's bank account so he can invest in Kate. After Kate goes to New York, Walden decides to confess who he really is. Walden meets Kate in New York and tells her the truth. Kate breaks up with Walden, but forgives him when she realizes he helped make her dream of being a fashion designer come true. Kate and Walden don't get back together, due to Kate staying in New York. On Valentine's Day, Walden and Kate meet up and sleep together. When they realize they can't get back together due to conflicting schedules, the couple agree to see other people.

Alan and Walden get married so Walden can adopt a child and not live alone. The adoption goes through so Alan and Walden divorce and Walden ends up dating their adoption social worker. After the scare from a threatening Charlie Harper, friends Alan and Walden continue to live together in Walden's beach house.

Jenny Harper 

Jenny Harper (Amber Tamblyn, Season 11, main; season 12, recurring) is the long lost, illegitimate daughter of Charlie Harper. An aspiring actress, Jenny first appears in the premiere episode of season 11, in which she comes to Malibu hoping to reconnect with her dad, though Walden and her uncle Alan tell her he is dead. 

It is later revealed that she is a lesbian, and some episodes of the eleventh season put emphasis on this, to the point of comedically portraying Jenny as a stereotypical lesbian who is uninterested in serious relationships and is content to have sex with any woman she meets, to the point that she is able to seduce (or "recruit") straight women (at one point, Walden claims that he didn't know one of Jenny's one-night-stands, who is his friend, was a lesbian, and Jenny responds "Neither did she until last week", insinuating that the woman was straight but Jenny made her gay), among them Walden's own mother. A brief running gag is Walden and Alan trying to keep their dates from meeting Jenny for this exact reason, though later in the series she abandons her promiscuous lifestyle and tries to find a steady lover. 

After warming up to her, Walden and Alan invite her to move in after she reveals she has nowhere to go. Though she exhibits many of Charlie's personality traits (particularly his sarcasm, alcoholism, and womanizing), Jenny is considerably much nicer and down-to-earth than he was. Thus far, she has formed good relationships with her surviving relatives, Walden, Berta and Walden's friend Barry (Clark Duke). She and Jake have never met thus far, but she does know he exists and would like to meet him. In "Welcome Home, Jake" she meets Barry for the first time, mistaking him for Jake. She happily gives him a hug only to be disgusted when she discovers the truth. She eventually takes a liking to Barry and the two become the best of friends. Though it is apparent that Walden is attracted to her, he believes she has no drive or ambition. Fearing she may turn into "another Alan", he tries to be a positive role model for her. Jenny considered Walden the greatest father figure she'd ever had. She moved from her home in New York City in order to find her dad in Malibu. She apparently has a poor relationship with her mother (like her father did) and the only reason she became an actress was "to piss her mother off," as she wanted her to become a doctor. In the twelfth season, Jenny uses her experience in the LGBT community to help Walden and Alan pose as a gay couple so that they can adopt Louis, and moves out of the beach house so Louis can stay in Jake's room. She makes a brief appearance in the final episode, where she receives a large cheque and an apology letter from Charlie, who survived his accident in Paris. She also appears to have gone back to her promiscuous ways, given that she was apparently having a threesome with two women and forgot they were in her bedroom.

Despite being introduced as the new "half man" in the eleventh season, she was replaced in that capacity by another character, Louis, for the twelfth and final season. Tamblyn's billing is also demoted to below Conchata Ferrell's, as the role was now recurring rather than regular.

Louis Schmidt 
Louis Schmidt (Edan Alexander, Season 12) is the child whom Walden and Alan foster. Louis and Alan bond almost instantly, whereas he and Walden initially do not bond, but they eventually find a common ground and form a strong father-son relationship. He also takes a liking to Berta and Evelyn as well. Louis' favorite snacks are Cheez-Its, cereal, and pancakes. He is officially adopted by Walden in the third-to-last episode. Notably, Louis is the only main character physically absent in the series finale, "Of Course He's Dead". This absence not being explained, although a picture of him is shown.

Berta 
Berta (Conchata Ferrell, Season 1 recurring; Seasons 2–12 regular) is the family housekeeper. In the first season, she is 63 years old, in the last season, she is about 74 and a half. Although she may be viewed as sarcastic, rude and sometimes outright disrespectful, Alan and Charlie still treat her with enormous respect, partly out of fear, and it is clear that the household cannot function properly without her. Berta has tried her best not to allow the overwhelming stress of her job to get to her head: when the very tidy Alan moved in, she quit and Charlie was so upset that Alan had to personally beg her to return, promising that Alan would do his own cleaning. However, the fact that Jake's bedroom could be confused with a dump (at various times including dead fish in the closet, food left-overs in his toy box, and nasal mucus under the bed), his toilet seat is frequently sprayed with urine, and his underwear is filthy, often leads to anger on her part. Her favorite line after a mini-disaster occurs in the house is, "I ain't cleaning that up." During the Kutcher years of the show her role on screen was increased. Season 11 was the first time she appeared in every single episode of a season.

Berta has a sister named Daisy (Camryn Manheim), with whom she does not get along. She also has three daughters and several granddaughters, whom she admits are "sleazy and easy" and sometimes brings along to work; a notable example was teenage granddaughter Prudence (Megan Fox). Berta has two ex-husbands; her first marriage lasted 15 years, and her second was a drunken Las Vegas escapade she refers to as "one hell of a weekend" which ended when she divorced him in Reno. She has served time in prison and worked as a prison barber. She uses, and makes references to, drugs (legal and otherwise); it is hinted that she has enjoyed many a joint during work hours and can produce a perfect one given the opportunity. She takes anxiolytics (Valium especially) in her coffee to reduce her violent tendencies. She was a groupie with the Grateful Dead and has implied that she had a lesbian experience during that time. While it was hinted several times before Charlie's death that he had changed his will so she'd inherit the beach house instead of Alan, that turned out to be untrue, although Berta was set to move out because the house had mortgages attached that Alan had no chance of paying.

Berta often calls Alan "Zippy". She and Alan are portrayed as the only people saddened over Charlie's death. She considered him to be the best boss she ever had. After Walden buys the house, he asks her to remain there as a live-in housekeeper. She agrees, mainly because she is extremely attracted to Walden and would often make discreet advances at him. This living arrangement is short-lived when she finds out that Alan will be moving back in, only this becomes more likely when Walden sees Berta invite a piggish houseguest over. She never thought she could work for anyone besides Charlie, but admits to Walden that he is instead the greatest boss she ever had, making Charlie second-best. Berta hardly ever shows any signs of attraction to Walden after season nine. Despite her displeasure of Jake's presence in the house when he originally moved in, she's far more friendly and welcoming to Louis when he moves in because he's cute and his background is similar to hers. 

In 2014, Ferrell revealed that Berta was originally intended to be an ethnic minority, but producers liked the way Ferrell performed the role. She also revealed that Berta was only intended to be in a two-episode arc of the first season and would leave due to Alan and his kid moving into the beach house, but producers extended the role and eventually made her a main cast member from season 2 onwards. In the final episode, Berta gets a large check from Charlie and seems to retire to Walden's beach house.

Evelyn Harper 
Evelyn Pepper (previously Harper, Gorsky, Thomas, King and Leopold; Holland Taylor, Seasons 1–9 regular; Seasons 10–12 recurring) is Charlie and Alan's mother and Jake and Jenny's grandmother. In the first season, she is 58 years old; out of vanity, she changes the year of her birth as she ages. She expresses a superficial fondness for her sons and grandson, but she rarely lives up to her self-perceived notion of being a devoted and misunderstood matriarch. Her sons and grandson generally return the favor and go out of their way to avoid interacting with her on most occasions. Her wide-ranging sex life is a recurring gag throughout the series  as she is attracted to both men and women. In addition to Teddy who was not actually "Courtney"'s father, Evelyn has been sexually involved with several parents of her sons' lovers and friends, including Rose's father, Gloria's mother, Gloria's presumed father, Gloria's likely biological father (i.e., the boys' father, Frank Harper), Walden's mother (with whom Charlie's daughter, Jenny, had already had sex), and Lyndsey's mother. She also bedded Charlie's ex-girlfriend Jill who had become Bill, and Walden. Evelyn has been widowed five times, her fifth marriage being the shortest as he died an hour after saying their vows.

The family frequently refers to her as "the devil" (or, as Charlie put it, "unholy mother of us"), and Charlie has her number on speed-dial in his cell phone as "666." Once, she showed up at the door in a black cloak while carrying a scythe. When Alan asked who it was, Charlie responded "It's Death," to which Alan replied, "Hi, mom!" It has been implied on one occasion that she is literally a witch (who is dreaded and feared by other witches) – one of Charlie's girls was a worshipper of the Devil, and was scared away by Evelyn. Wealthy, with a luxurious house in Beverly Hills, she has been married numerous times and sells real estate. When Charlie died, surprisingly, she was distraught over his death. At his funeral, however, she continuously mentions her intention to sell his house while Alan was giving his eulogy. Her relationship with Alan has somewhat gotten better since Charlie's death, as she has acknowledged that he is not just her second-born son, he is now the only son she has left, as well. When Alan almost died from a heart attack, she feared for his life, because not only did she not want to lose another child, her "good son" was already deceased.

Two years after Charlie's death, she finally meets her long lost granddaughter Jenny. Surprisingly, Evelyn embraces her newfound grandchild and completely disowns Jake; she had previously said she would have enjoyed a relationship with Jake, but "got to him" too late for proper bonding. In the eleventh season she marries for the sixth time, this time to her much older lover, Marty Pepper.

She rarely appeared during season nine, but was prominent in the last few episodes of the season. Despite still credited and billed as a main character, Evelyn only made one appearance in the tenth season and several appearances in season eleven. In the final season she shows up at Alan and Walden's wedding followed by sleeping with "Michael Bolton" and Walden's mother Robin then also has sex with a fake Santa Claus and in the last episode when Alan needs Charlie's death certificate and she gets threatening message from Charlie.

Judith Harper-Melnick 
Judith Harper-Melnick (Marin Hinkle, Seasons 1–9 regular; Seasons 10–12 guest) is Alan's cheating, vindictive, cold hearted, self-absorbed, and humorless first wife. She seems to despise Alan and takes any chance to humiliate him. She was the first woman Alan ever slept with, but their marriage was cold: according to her, the only time she was ever happy being sexual was when she was pregnant with Jake. In the pilot, she lied to him about realizing she was homosexual as an excuse to end the marriage, and in subsequent episode he caught her picking up multiple men. She made no secret of living luxuriously with Alan's alimony, seeing as she has not held a job since she divorced him. She has since remarried to Dr. Herbert "Herb" Melnick (Ryan Stiles), Jake's pediatrician, a union that brought joy to Alan because it meant he no longer had to pay alimony.

In season six, she threw Herb out of the house and briefly reunited with Alan before reconciling with Herb, and it was later revealed she was pregnant with a daughter, whom she eventually named Millie. Alan hoped he was the father, but Judith said she would kill him if he revealed that he slept with her, and after she gave birth in the sixth-season finale, the child's parentage remained uncertain, as Judith was with both Herb and Alan around the time Millie was conceived. Jake and Berta describe Millie as looking nothing like Judith or Herb but more like a girl version of Alan, implying Alan is the probable biological father.

In seasons seven and nine, Judith made very few appearances but was featured in almost every episode in season eight. Unlike her relationship with Charlie, Judith got along with Walden just fine – mostly due to her initial interest in him. She was not seen since the season nine finale until towards the end of season ten, with only being briefly mentioned for most of the season. In the episode "Run, Steven Staven! Run!", Judith's absence is finally explained when Herb mentions that Judith moved out when he cheated on her with his receptionist (yet in season 11, she is shown to still be living there). However, in the 19th episode of season ten, she reappears after a long absence when Herb starts to go crazy. Walden and Alan call her to go to Herb's hotel room and take him back.

She plays a major role in the season eleven episode "Cab Fare and a Bottle of Penicillin", when Alan showed up at her house just to talk about old times and after a night of drinking they end up engaged. However, in the end, Judith ends the engagement after Walden explains to her that Alan had proposed to Lindsey the same night he proposed to her (however he did not explain that she didn't accept Alan's proposal as she is now engaged to Larry). Angered by this, she kicks Alan in the groin. It is unknown if she and Herb have officially divorced or are just separated. In the final episode, Alan calls her thinking that Charlie is going to kill him and he tells her that she was his only true love. Having just received a generous payment from their newly wealthy son Jake, she tells Alan she has another call and hangs up on him.

Rose 
Rose (Melanie Lynskey, Seasons 1–2 regular; Seasons 3–7, 9–10, 12 recurring; Seasons 8 & 11 Guest) is the Harpers' wealthy neighbor and Charlie's stalker and after his death, she finds new love and a stalker victim in Walden. The character has been described as a sociopath although she has a warm and friendly exterior.

Although she is somewhat mentally unhinged and obsessed with Charlie, Rose expressed that she "has an undergraduate degree from Princeton University (which she completed in 2 years) and a master's degree in behavioral psychology from Stanford University." Throughout the series, Rose has applied her knowledge of interpersonal communication towards the various situations that arise. Her family is involved in banking and oil, making them, and implicitly her, extremely wealthy. Martin Sheen, who is Charlie Sheen's real-life father, made a guest-appearance on the show as Rose's equally-disturbed father, Harvey, who similarly obsessed over Evelyn after sleeping with her once. Rose's paternal grandparents were first cousins, to which her grandmother attributes Rose's and Harvey's mental issues. Rose also has five ferrets, all named "Charlie," as was revealed in Season 2's "The Salmon Under My Sweater." 

She was one of Charlie's one-night stands who won't allow him to forget about her as he does all his other sexual conquests. Rose acknowledges that she is "boundary challenged", while Charlie and Alan refer to her as Charlie's stalker. In the pilot, she told Alan that she sneaks into Charlie's room while he's asleep and tries on his underwear. Usually uninvited, she enters and exits Charlie's house by climbing onto the backyard deck, rather than using the front door. She has been caught by Charlie and Alan as she has watched them while sleeping on several occasions. While credited among the main cast in CBS press releases in Season 3–4, she was credited as a recurring star in on-screen credits. After season 4, she left for London and appeared on the show only rarely. She later returns to Malibu in Season 5, though no longer living next door to Charlie, hence her less frequent appearances. She claims she was sent away from England after "an incident at Buckingham Palace." In Season 6, she became friends with Charlie's fiancée Chelsea and went on a blind date with Alan; the two began dating before Rose evinced the same jealousy and possessiveness towards Alan that she had applied towards Charlie, right down to gluing things to his genitals.

Her only appearance in Season 7 was in "Gumby with a Pokey" when Charlie begins to hallucinate (after taking medicinal marijuana). Women in his past interrogate why he mistreated them, then he goes out to the deck to discover Rose; unlike the other women, Rose is really there. She made multiple appearances in Season 8, after staging her wedding, which makes Charlie realize he probably loves her. In the last episode of Season 8, Charlie leaves for Paris with her. In Season 9, Rose reveals that she and Charlie got engaged in Paris. It is implied she may have had something to do with Charlie's death after she returned to their Paris hotel to find him showering with another woman. She reappears again at the end of "What a Lovely Landing Strip" catching Walden's ex-wife Bridget spying on Walden and his new girlfriend, she then tells her that she can help her in making Walden suffer. She makes a brief cameo through archive footage in a flashback montage in the episode "Oh Look! Al-Qaeda!". She returns in Season 10's "That's Not What They Call It in Amsterdam" now dating Walden, much to Alan's dismay. The relationship gets serious but is short lived when Walden reconciles with Zoey. However, Rose gets revenge by telling Zoey that she is pregnant with Walden's baby. Walden ends up without Zoey or Rose. Rose continues to stalk Walden as well as the Harpers, despite Charlie's death. Rose returns in "Advantage: Fat, Flying Baby", at the end where it's discovered that Rose is Walden's girlfriend's new investor for her fashion line. 

In the series finale "Of Course He's Dead", it is revealed that Rose lied about Charlie's death. She did catch him cheating and kept him imprisoned in her basement. However, Charlie escaped and used the royalties from his children's songs to pay back all the people he wronged and threatened Evelyn, Alan and Walden. Rose reveals the truth to them, but is not jailed for the crime.

Kandi Harper 
Kandi Harper (April Bowlby, Season 3 recurring, Season 4 main, Season 10 guest, Season 12 guest) is Alan's second ex-wife. She was credited among the main cast during the fourth season. Initially Charlie's gorgeous but dim-witted girlfriend until Charlie broke it off with her so he could date Mia. When Judith (who later became Kandi's confidante) initially tried to end Kandi's relationship with Alan, Kandi's mother Mandi (Gail O'Grady), who also had a brief fling with Charlie during that time, made sure the couple were dating again. During this time Judith briefly dated Kandi's father Andi (Kevin Sorbo) leading an interesting joke Jake told his father about the possibility Kandi could be his stepmother, stepsister and stepcousin all at once. Kandi and Alan had a superficial relationship based mostly on sex, but they eventually wed in Las Vegas, where they also won half a million dollars. After only four months of marriage, and spending nearly all of their winnings, Kandi kicked Alan out of their condominium, which was later revealed to be because Alan did not want to have another child with her. With Judith's help, Kandi acquires (and seduces) Judith's lawyer from her divorce and, despite only being married to him four months, manages to claim alimony payments from Alan, making him all the poorer and dependent on Charlie. Kandi is soon offered a role as a forensics expert on a CSI-type television series, entitled Stiffs. At the same time, Alan sees that Jake is practically grown up and he returns to Kandi to agree to have a baby with her. However, moments before they try to conceive, Kandi finally signs the divorce papers to ensure that Alan will not have any claim on her new-found television lucre, and disappears from Alan's life. In the tenth season, Kandi resurfaces as a television star and tries to win Alan back, but despite his temptations, Alan ultimately rejects her, as he is in a relationship with Lyndsey McElroy. After a paparazzo acquires altered photographs of them together, Kandi goes to explain the situation to Lyndsey, and for unknown reasons they end up having sex. 

In the final episode, Kandi has become a celebrity, and is seen being mobbed by photographers. Alan, fearing the wrath of a very-alive Charlie, telephones her to tell her she was the love of his life. She is the only one of Alan's lovers to be genuinely touched by his words, indicating that she may have been the only woman to actually love Alan. 

Prior to playing Kandi, Bowlby had appeared as another character named Kimber.

Chelsea Melini 
Chelsea Christine Melini (Jennifer Bini Taylor, Season 6 recurring; Season 7 regular, Season 9 guest, Season 12 guest) is Charlie's girlfriend for most of season six, who has moved into his house by the season's end. Formerly a one-night stand, Chelsea seems to be one of the few women out of Charlie's countless relationships that has caused him to try to make positive changes in his degenerate lifestyle. She became close friends with Alan, something Charlie enjoyed because Alan could take her to museums and foreign films (activities that Charlie cannot stand). In the seventh season premiere, Charlie finally decides to let go of Mia and commit to Chelsea. As the season progresses, however, Chelsea unintentionally begins to bring out Charlie's evil side, as he starts treating Alan and Jake cruelly if they accidentally inconvenience her. Eventually they plan to marry, but after Chelsea becomes attracted to Alan's lawyer, Brad, and Charlie vomits on a baby, Chelsea postpones the wedding, resulting in a rift, during which Charlie vents his anger on Alan by forcing him to sleep on the couch so he can sleep in Alan's room. Charlie and Chelsea make several attempts to reconcile, most recently following her breakup with Brad. Chelsea tried to reunite with Charlie, but was thwarted due to her best friend, Gail (Tricia Helfer), sleeping with him. Jake later gives Chelsea a necklace that Charlie got her for her birthday and she goes outside to see him, but when she got there, Charlie was in trouble with the police for rear ending a police car, with a suspended license. Jake was driving at the beginning of this episode, but when the police came after them in a cop car, Jake and Charlie switched seats, causing Charlie to lose his license. While credited among the main cast as Jennifer Taylor during the seventh season, CBS press releases bill her as a recurring character. At Charlie's funeral, she spitefully says that he gave her chlamydia. She appears in the finale with a huge check from Charlie and an apology letter for shooting her while they were dating. 

Bini Taylor previously appeared in the pilot episode as a woman in the grocery store aisle complimenting Charlie and Jake, and again in Season 2 as Tina, one of the women Charlie apologizes to as he tries to find out who set up the 'Charlie Harper Sucks' website.
'''' Recurring  characters 
Legend
 = Recurring cast (actor appears in three or more episodes that season)
 = Guest cast (actor appears in two or fewer episodes that season)

 Ava Pierce 
Ava Pierce (Talyan Wright, seasons 9–10) portrays Zoey's young daughter from her marriage to Nigel. Well mannered and intelligent, Ava adored Walden, and is 108th in line to the throne. Ava invites Walden to her birthday during season ten, despite her mother having broken up with him.

 Billy Stanhope 
Billy Stanhope (Patton Oswalt, season 9–10), Walden's business partner and frenemy. Walden and Billy have a love-and-hate relationship, and even though they don't realize it, they're probably best friends. In season nine, after years of not speaking to each other, Walden and Billy start their business back up again and work together on a project they call the "electronic suitcase". In Billy's next appearance, he reveals that he has been seeing Walden's ex-wife, Bridget. Walden and Billy sell the electronic suitcase in season ten for $1.2 billion. In mid-season ten, Bridget breaks up with Billy, resulting in Walden, Alan, Billy, and Herb having a guys' night out, drinking and complaining about women. He is never seen or mentioned again after this episode.

 Bridget Schmidt 
Bridget Schmidt (Judy Greer, season 9–10, season 12), the ex-wife of Walden Schmidt. She initiated the divorce proceedings because she felt Walden would never become a mature adult, but after the divorce was ready to be finalized she decided she loved him anew and wanted him back. Unfortunately, Walden decided to sign the divorce papers and continue his nascent relationship with Zoey, leading Bridget to become violently unhinged and to fall into the orbit of a returned-from-Paris Rose. This is later proven to be a one-off gag for that particular episode as Bridget later started dating Walden's business partner, Billy, at the end of season nine, but she left him in "Run, Steven Staven! Run!". Bridget makes an appearance in the series finale "Of Course He's Dead" in which she talks to Walden on the phone while in bed with actor John Stamos, who previously appeared in "Nice to Meet You, Walden Schmidt" (Walden's debut episode).

In Season 4, Greer portrayed the role of Myra Melnick the sister of Herb Melnick, Judith's fiancé/husband, in the episodes "Smooth as a Ken Doll" and "Aunt Myra Doesn't Pee a Lot", during which she had a brief swing with Charlie before she returned home to her fiancé, whose existence came as a shock to Charlie.

 Celeste Burnett 
Celeste Burnett (Tinashe Kachingwe, seasons 6–7), Jake's ex-girlfriend, and main love interest of seasons six and seven. Jake first meets Celeste when she and her dad, Jerome, move in next door to Charlie. Jake and Celeste secretly date at first because her father is over protective, but he eventually gives the couple his blessing. Celeste shows to be controlling over Jake, but he doesn't seem to notice. In season seven, Celeste spends Christmas with her mother, so Charlie convinces Jake to cheat on Celeste. Celeste stops by Charlie's house to give Jake his Christmas present, but when she sees that he is cheating on her, she breaks up with him. Jake tries to get Celeste back in the following episode, but has no luck.

 Courtney Leopold/Sylvia Fishman 
Courtney Leopold/Sylvia Fishman (Jenny McCarthy, seasons 5, 8–9), Charlie's girlfriend for a multi-episode thread. Charlie falls for "Courtney", whom he believes is the daughter of Evelyn's fiancé, and lends her a substantial amount of money and proposes shortly before they are to become step-siblings. She also forced Charlie to buy a car from her so the secret of their relationship would not get out to her father and Evelyn. Charlie is heart-broken to learn that she is actually a con artist named Sylvia Fishman, but he retains feelings for her, telling her that he will "wait" for her (to get out of prison). She reappears in Season 8's "Ow, Ow, Don't Stop" after being released from prison, and Charlie immediately falls for her again, even professing his love for her. The two break up two episodes later in "Chocolate Diddlers or My Puppy's Dead" when they realize they have simply lost their feelings for one another and, in an extremely rare case for Charlie, they part mutually and on good terms. In the season 9 episode "Nine Magic Fingers", Courtney starts dating Walden, but their relationship is short-lived as Alan and Bridget successfully convince Walden that Courtney is a con artist.

 Dr. Linda Freeman 
Dr. Linda Freeman (Jane Lynch, seasons 1, 3–9, 11), initially as Jake's, then as Charlie's and occasionally Alan's adept, incisive but money-hungry psychiatrist. Often when Charlie or Alan are just getting to the root of their problem, Dr. Freeman notes that the area is interesting, "but, unfortunately, we're out of time". She prides herself as a guesser and is quite sarcastic, especially with Charlie. A recurring gag is her frequent over-billing, once charging Charlie a full hour's fee ($200) for 5 minutes of consultation, and on another occasion while treating Alan for insomnia she billed him for an entire hour after he slept for 40 minutes of the session pointing out that she was awake. In one episode, she tells Charlie to open up and not hold anything back as her hourly fee comes to "$7 a minute". During her sessions with Jake, Dr. Freeman displays a rather quirky demeanor and is noted for her use of a cow hand puppet. She later has a session with Walden in season 9. It is implied that she (like her actress) is bisexual, as after Walden hugs her, she remarks "Hmph. Maybe I'm not gay."

 Barry Foster 
Barry Foster (Clark Duke, seasons 11–12), was the working partner of Walden's love interest at the time Nicole. He is a full grown man but due to his youthful looks, childish personality, and short stature – he is often mistaken to be a kid. After Nicole left Malibu to work for Google in San Francisco, Barry was left homeless and without a job. He moves in with Walden temporarily, until Walden decides he's had enough of people moving into his house so he found Barry an apartment. Barry idolizes Walden to the point it's borderline obsession. Nevertheless, Walden takes a liking to Barry and the two become good friends. Despite having his own place, Barry tends to spend most of his time at the beach house hanging out with Jenny (the two become best friends of sorts and are seen as a sort of a double act – similar to Jake and Eldridge), or eating their food. Jenny, Alan and Berta mistook him for Jake upon meeting him for the first time. Since his first appearance on the show, Barry's role gradually becomes more significant. Barry only makes one appearance in season 12. He is there when the birth mother of Walden and Alan's supposed child goes into labour and stays to be there with them. He is never seen or mentioned again after this episode.

 Eldridge McElroy 
Eldridge McElroy (Graham Patrick Martin, seasons 7–9), Jake's best friend whose mother Lyndsey (Courtney Thorne-Smith) dated Alan. Eldridge is a very dim-witted drummer and somewhat of a troublemaker. In his first appearance at the end of season 7, he and Jake get into trouble after sneaking off to the beach with "a few" beers. Jake and Eldridge are often portrayed reinforcing one another's stupidity, and by season 9, have become chronic stoners. While Jake and Eldridge are friends, the relationship between their parents briefly causes some friction, but their friendship survives and they decide to join the Army following their high school graduation. Eldridge is never seen or mentioned again by name after season 10 (where Jake mentions while talking to Alan about them talking about Lyndsey and his relationship), though in season 12, a drunk Lyndsey does make reference to her and Alan both having screwed-up kids.

 Ms. McMartin 
Ms. McMartin (Maggie Lawson, season 12), is the social worker who places Louis into Walden and Alan's care in the final season, when they get married as it is simpler for a couple to adopt. Walden has an attraction to her which he finds hard to hide as he needs to appear gay in order to successfully adopt. Eventually, Alan and Ms. McMartin have sex, but when Alan reunites with Lyndsey, Walden and Ms. McMartin sleep together. Though they initially decide to go their separate ways as they believed the romance was just in the heat of the moment and they weren't truly a thing, Walden decides he doesn't want to be alone forever and that he truly loves Ms. McMartin. He then goes to ask for another chance, and after serenading her with Michael Bolton, she accepts. While Alan once asked Ms. McMartin what her first name is, her response is not shown to the audience.  To show respect in Louis' presence, Alan and Walden continue to refer to her as Ms. McMartin (one of the show producers is named Susan McMartin).

 Gordon 
Gordon (J.D. Walsh, seasons 1–4, 6–8), a pizza delivery driver who idolized Charlie. During the third season he has a brief relationship with Rose, who forces him to dress like Charlie and yell the latter's name during sex. After their break-up, he disappears from the show, but returned in season six, again delivering pizzas. He revealed how he became a millionaire on the stock market, got married and subsequently divorced and then lost all his money to his ex-wife, forcing him to return to pizza delivery. He looked up to Charlie, often calling him a genius and always addressing him as "Mr. Harper" rather than the more familiar "Charlie".  Charlie invariably orders pizza from Gordon's pizzeria for him to deliver, irrespective of the distance; including when subletting his own live-in girlfriend Chelsea's old apartment in the San Fernando Valley, and when camped out with Alan et al. in Lyndsey's burned-out house twenty miles from the beach. Gordon is unaware that Alan briefly dated Rose after his own relationship with her. Since he never appeared again after Season 8, it will always remain unknown if he knows that Charlie had gone missing.

 Herb Melnick 
Dr. Herbert "Herb" Melnick (Ryan Stiles, season 2, 4–10, 12) portrays Judith's goofy, train-hobbyist, pediatrician second husband and Jake's stepfather. He first appeared as Judith's date in Season 2's "Enjoy Those Garlic Balls," but due to an inconsistency in the storyline, he was initially referred to as "Greg Melnick." Not particularly happily married to uptight Judith, he is laid-back and gets along with the Harper brothers, whose lifestyles he appears to envy at times—such as Charlie's partying and the fact that Alan was married to Kandi and later dates neighborhood MILF (and former soft-core porn actress) Lyndsey McElroy. He finally achieves his dream of dating Lyndsey in the twelfth season. He and the other men in Judith's neighborhood similarly idolize Lyndsey's ex-husband Chris for repeatedly seducing the babysitter. He has stated that he likes spending time with the Harpers, and called Charlie "a little loosie-goosie with the liquor and the ladies, but all-in-all a good fella" (which did not impress Judith). In the Season 6 finale, Judith gives birth to their daughter, whom they name Millie Melnick. However, Herb does not know that Judith had a brief affair with Alan around the time Millie was conceived, and remains in the dark about the fact that Alan could possibly be Millie's biological father. Single for most of his life, Herb's hobbies center on gardening, his large model train layout, and "accidentally" bumping into Lyndsey every morning. Sexually, he is particularly adept at cunnilingus. In season ten, Herb has an affair with his receptionist and Judith leaves him; he keeps the house (Alan's former house). After she leaves him Alan lives with him briefly after he and Walden have a fight, and tries to convince Alan to 
stay to avoid his loneliness without Judith. He begins to party out of control to get over Judith, so Walden and Alan call Judith to try and calm him down (a rare moment of Alan and Judith working together). Herb and Judith then reluctantly get back together and Herb returns to normalcy.

Herb does not make a single appearance in Season 11. In the episode "Cab Fare and a Bottle of Pencillin", it is implied that he and Judith have separated for a third time and have possibly divorced, as he is nowhere to be seen at his and Judith's house. He returns in season 12 when Walden invites him, Barry and Larry over to celebrate that he and Alan will be adopting a child. He is there with Walden and Alan when the birth mother goes into labor and decides to stay with them because he wanted to be there to support them. Notably, Herb does not appear in the series finale, nor is there any further mention of his whereabouts.

 Judge Linda Harris 
Judge Linda Harris (Ming-Na Wen, season 5), Charlie's main love interest of the fifth season. Charlie and Linda met through Alan, and his girlfriend Donna. Charlie and Linda's first date doesn't go as planned, but Charlie gets himself arrested in order to see Linda at court. Linda agrees to give Charlie another chance. Linda and Charlie start to get serious, but their relationship is in trouble when Charlie starts to see Rose's face on every woman he sees. Charlie flies to London to see Rose, but when he learns that Rose is ready to start a family, Charlie flees London and continues his relationship with Linda. Charlie learns that he is good with kids when he meets Linda's son, Brandon. Charlie makes Brandon a mix tape of kid's songs, and when Linda's ex-husband hears them, he offers Charlie a job as a kids' singer. When Linda is awarded as "Judge of the Year", she takes Charlie to a function that celebrates her. Evelyn accidentally gives Charlie the wrong pill that instead of calming him down, it makes him act crazy. After being humiliated at the function, Linda breaks up with Charlie.

 Kate 
Kate (Brooke D'Orsay, season 10–11), Walden's ex-girlfriend and main love interest of season ten. Walden decides he wants to come up with a new persona so he can meet a girl who isn't after his money. Walden pretends to be the make believe Sam Wilson. Walden and Kate meet at the department store where she works. Walden (as "Sam") and Kate go on a few dates and Kate meets Alan, "Sam's" landlord and she hates him. Kate tells Walden that he can move in with her and he agrees. They also spend Christmas together. Walden has Alan invest in Kate's fashion line with Walden's money and Kate goes to New York to host her fashion show. Walden feels depressed with Kate gone and he gains a lot of weight. Alan helps Walden lose it and they fly to New York so Walden can tell Kate who he is. Kate gets furious and breaks up with him but later realizes that Walden helped her get her fashion show so she forgives him but they remain broken up since Kate has to stay in New York. Kate returns three episodes later and Walden spends Valentine's Day with her. They are forced to break up due to their busy schedules. It is revealed to the audience that Rose is Kate's new fashion line investor (Walden and Alan are ignorant of Rose's involvement, and Kate is unaware of Rose's connection to them and her psychosis). She returns in the season 11 episode "West Side Story" inviting Walden to her boutique opening. They then have dinner in the restaurant where they had their first date agreeing not to have sex afterwards, but they end up in bed and right when they are about to have sex, they both get food poisoning from the fish they ate at the restaurant. In the following episode "Lan Mao Shi Zai Wuding Shang", Kate goes to San Francisco for a few days and Walden was planning on proposing to her when she got back. He then meets a woman named Vivian and falls for her. He tells Kate when she gets back and they break up for good. She is never seen or mentioned again after this episode.

 Larry Martin 
Larry Martin (D. B. Sweeney, season 11–12), was Lyndsey's boyfriend after she and Alan broke up. However Lyndsey began cheating on Larry with Alan because he was apparently bad in bed. Alan thinks that he and Lyndsey will get back together, but Lyndsey says she likes all the qualities Larry has that Alan doesn't and therefore only wants the relationship with Alan to be sexual. To find out more about Larry, Alan created a pseudonym of "Jeff Strongman". Larry and "Jeff" hit it off and eventually become best friends. Larry attends a gym and helps out with charities, but he is very naive and later on develops into an "idiot" character. He has a sister, Gretchen (Kimberly Williams-Paisley), whom he sets up with Jeff. He proposes to Lyndsey halfway through the season just as Alan was about to. Lyndsey says yes to Larry and Larry asks Jeff to be his best man, much to the chagrin of Lyndsey who is irritated by Alan's close friendship with Larry. Larry seems to have no shame as he doesn't mind listening to Jeff and his sister having sex in the next room. It can be argued that he is the most important recurring character in the eleventh season, as the overarching storyline for the season revolves around his relationships with Alan and Lyndsey. When Alan reveals who he truly is to Larry, he initially struggles to understand. When the realization hits him, Larry cancels his wedding with Lyndsey. He attends Alan and Gretchen's wedding, making it clear that he blames Lyndsey not Alan. However, when Walden accidentally reveals to him that Alan was cheating with Lyndsey, Larry goes to confront Alan, only for Walden to push Larry off of the deck of the beach house. He returns in the season 12 episode "Thirty-Eight, Sixty-Two, Thirty-Eight", surprisingly still good friends with Alan and Walden. Walden calls him, Herb and Barry over to celebrate the fact that he and Alan will be receiving a child. However, he is confused by that fact and believes that one of the two men will be having the baby. He is there with them when the birth mother goes into labour as he wanted to be there with them, saying "to raise a child it takes the Village People". He is never seen or mentioned again after this episode.

 Lyndsey McElroy 
Lyndsey McElroy (Courtney Thorne-Smith, season 7–12), Alan's on-again/off-again girlfriend in the later seasons, the mother of Jake's best friend, Eldridge (Graham Patrick Martin), and – to her extreme consternation – the daughter of Evelyn's lover, Jean (Georgia Engel). Years ago, she was featured in a soft-core porn movie, Cinnamon's Buns''. She and Eldridge live in the San Fernando Valley, across the street from Judith, Herb, Jake, and Millie. She divorced her husband Chris after discovering his affair with their babysitter. Alan began dating Lyndsey at the end of season 7, and their relationship was initially kept a secret from their sons. They have since had several breakups and reunions. In the Season 9 episode "One False Move, Zimbabwe!", Alan says Lyndsey is dating someone else, a fact later confirmed when he meets her very young (and rich, and handsome) boyfriend and is misled into thinking he could reunite with her. However, Lyndsey later breaks up with the boyfriend and tells Alan she wants to resume dating him; he is initially happy, then somewhat downcast when she explains that she had to work too hard to look sexy and cover up her bodily functions to keep the young guy, and she can forget about all that with Alan because he's not going to find anyone else. Alan later tells Jake that he and Lyndsey are dating but have absolutely no intention of getting married. They however get engaged in the season ten episode "Something My Gynecologist Said". This does not deter Lyndsey from having sex with Alan's ex-wife Kandi when Kandi attempts to reconcile with Alan. Later, in season ten, Lyndsey breaks up with Alan again and begins dating a man named Nick. Nick is unseen, though Alan spies on him and Lyndsey and hears them having loud sex. As season eleven begins, it is unknown what happened to Nick, but Lyndsey reveals she is dating another man who turns out to be Larry Martin. She still keeps Alan around for sex only, revealing that Larry is lousy in bed but that she likes all of his other qualities. Larry eventually proposes to Lyndsey and she accepts, but the wedding is cancelled when Larry learns of Alan's true identity and that Lyndsey cheated. Lyndsey returns early in season twelve after 60 days in alcohol rehab, only to find out that Alan married Walden. She immediately gets drunk and goes to Alan, suggesting that they resume their sex-only relationship. In the last few episodes, she is planning on moving away until she gets back together with Alan and accepts his marriage proposal after seeing the huge engagement ring that Walden purchased for Alan to give to Lyndsey. In the final episode, Alan telephones Lyndsey to inform her that should anything happen to him, she was the love of his life (since he currently fears the wrath of a very-alive Charlie). Though she tells him she loves him, she is in a pawn shop selling Alan's engagement ring behind his back.

Megan 
Megan (Macey Cruthird, seasons 8–9), Jake's math tutor and brief girlfriend. Jake develops a crush on Megan in season eight, but she does not reciprocate the feelings. In season nine, Megan falls for Walden which makes Jake jealous. After realizing she has no chance with Walden, she settles for Jake and they start dating. When Alan is sent to a mental hospital, he has a nightmare that Jake gets Megan pregnant but in reality, Jake reveals that he and Megan never had sex, but he plans to that evening. It is assumed they broke up as Jake had sex with an older woman in "Not In My Mouth!"

Melissa 
Melissa (Kelly Stables, seasons 6–8), Alan's receptionist who briefly dated Charlie before starting a relationship with Alan. She broke off the relationship after discovering Alan in bed with her mother (Alan was under the influence of marijuana, provided by Melissa's mother). The two reconcile and begin dating again, but Alan's cheapness and lack of a private area for them to make love causes a second breakup. She reappeared in Alan's life in the second episode of season 8 ("A Bottle of Wine and a Jackhammer"), complicating Alan's relationship with Lyndsey. Alan and she had a bad breakup and she violently forced Charlie to reveal Alan's location with Lyndsey, but she never showed up there, wasn't a factor in Alan and Lyndsey's breakup at the time, and has not been seen since. She was mentioned in "A Giant Cat Holding a Churro" when Alan was sharing his secrets with Lyndsey, saying he "cheated on her with an old girlfriend."

Mia 
Mia (Emmanuelle Vaugier, season 3 recurring, seasons 5–7, 9, 12), a ballet teacher whom Charlie Harper fell in love with during the third season. She got him to clean up his act by not drinking or smoking as much, not wearing bowling shirts as well as not eating meat. However, he breaks up with her after he becomes fed up with the way she was trying to control his behavior. She then takes a job in New York City. She returns towards the end of the third season when her dancing group comes to town, and she asks Charlie for his sperm so she can have a baby. He attempts but fails, and he then proposes marriage to her, in which she accepts. Initially, Alan was their wedding planner, however after a big blowout with Mia's parents, they agree to go to Las Vegas and elope. Just as they are about to be married, Mia implies that Alan and Jake will be moving out after they wed, and Charlie refuses to throw out his family. They break off the engagement and she leaves. Mia returns in the fifth season when Charlie sees that she is marrying another man, and he attempts to win her back, but her father punches him out. She returns again the sixth and seventh seasons after her divorce in hopes that Charlie will help her with a new-found singing career. She's a terrible singer. Charlie then has to choose between Mia and his then-fiancée Chelsea. After much consideration, Charlie chooses Chelsea and abandons Mia at the recording studio. Mia also makes a brief guest appearance in the ninth season première at Charlie's funeral. In the final episode, Mia gets a letter of apology from Charlie for having an affair with her sister, along with a large check. When she sees the amount, she says "Screw my sister", presumably forgiving him.

Robin Schmidt 
Robin Schmidt (Mimi Rogers, season 9–12), the primatologist mother of Walden Schmidt. Robin is on the board of directors at Walden's company along with Walden, Bridget, and later Alan. Robin raised Walden from birth until he was four with a baby gorilla to study the differences of the growth between humans and monkeys. Walden spends Christmas in season nine with Robin. Robin is quite wealthy and has a good relationship with both Bridget and Zoey. Robin teamed up with Bridget to get Walden kicked off the board of directors because she felt he was using money irresponsibly (she give Alan a "happy ending" in the men's room of a bar to accomplish this). In season 11, she appeared at a fundraiser with Lynda Carter, and at the end of the episode it is implied she had a threesome with Jenny and Lynda. A similar scenario occurs after her sons' wedding, where she has a threesome with Michael Bolton and Evelyn Harper.

Teddy Leopold/Nathan Krunk 
Teddy Leopold/Nathan Krunk (Robert Wagner, seasons 4–5), Evelyn's fiancé, thought to be the father of Courtney. He is later revealed to be Courtney's partner in a con game, moments before he marries Evelyn. Teddy first appears in the season four finale and maintains a recurring role halfway through season five where he and Evelyn become engaged and married. On their wedding day, right after being married, Teddy is found with his pants down, dead on Charlie's bed. It appears Courtney wasn't his daughter but his partner; their real names were Nathan Krunk and Sylvia Fishman. Teddy is Evelyn's fifth deceased husband, although their marriage was not consummated before he widowed her. His catchphrase was, "terrific".

Zoey Hyde-Tottingham-Pierce 
Zoey Hyde-Tottingham-Pierce (Sophie Winkleman, seasons 9–10, 12), the British girlfriend of Walden Schmidt up until the second episode of season 10. She is much more mature than Walden. She has an energetic daughter in kindergarten and is divorced. She is a lawyer and has a slight disdain towards Alan and the French. In the season ten episode "Ferrets, Attack!", Zoey attempts to reconcile with Walden but she finds out Rose moved her things into Walden's house without permission. Walden leaves Rose for Zoey, but Zoey no longer wants him as she is mad that he and Rose became serious. She has not been seen since and only briefly mentioned twice. In the final episode, Walden calls Zoey and discovers she has married well and is being crowned Queen of Moldavia.

Marty Pepper 
Marty Pepper (Carl Reiner, seasons 7–8, 11), Evelyn's much older boyfriend, a retired TV producer. Evelyn first invites him to Charlie's house when she goes to visit. He believes Alan and Charlie to be gay and Jake to be their adopted son, which he quips would make a great sitcom. This becomes the premise of season 12 of the show with Alan and Walden marrying to adopt a child. He gives the boys advice on how to score with women, telling them to say to a woman that he will give her, her own sitcom. He reappeared in season 11 in multiple episodes. He meets Evelyn's newly found granddaughter but does not like her living with them when Walden throws her out of his house as she is receiving all of Evelyn's attention, leaving no time for sex between them. He initially mistakes Evelyn inviting Jenny to stay as a sexual reason as he had never done a grandmother/grandchild combination before. He believes Walden and Alan to be gay and ask the minister to marry them at his and Evelyn's wedding. He puts Walden and Alan in charge of his stag party, but it ends in disaster and he breaks off the engagement as he does not want to be tied down, but he eventually resumes the marriage and becomes Evelyn's sixth husband with Walden and Alan as his best men. He believes Walden to be one of Evelyn's sons and prefers him over Alan, as most people do. He and Evelyn reportedly have an "open marriage", in that they can sleep with other people, as Evelyn does on at least 2 occasions following the wedding. In his original appearance ("Warning, It's Dirty") the character was slightly different, he spoke with a slight lisp and out of one side of his mouth. These traits were dropped in his subsequent appearances.

Minor 
 Judy Greer as Myra Melnick (season 4), Herb's sister and a brief love interest of Charlie. Myra stays with Judith and Herb before their wedding, but due to many conflicts between Myra and Judith, Charlie invites her to stay with them. Myra and Charlie end up sleeping together. At Judith and Herb's wedding, Myra breaks up with Charlie when she reveals that she has to go home to her fiancé.
 Kimberly Quinn as Donna (season 5), Alan's girlfriend for two episodes. Donna and Alan met at a PTA meeting and became a couple. Donna set Charlie up with his long-term girlfriend, Linda Harris (Ming-Na Wen). Alan breaks up with Donna after he feels like their relationship has lost its spark, only to learn that Donna planned a threesome for the couple. Alan attempts to reconcile, but Donna kicks him out.
 Michael Clarke Duncan as Jerome (season 6), the Harper's neighbor as of season six. Jerome is a former football player, and the father of Jake's ex-girlfriend, Celeste. Jerome is over protective of his daughter dating Jake, but eventually gives them his blessing. Jerome befriends Charlie and Alan, and even shows a soft side when he cries over his daughter growing up too fast. Jerome and Celeste's mother are divorced.
 Judd Nelson as Chris MacElroy (season 8), Lyndsey MacElroy's ex-husband, and the father of Eldridge. Chris cheated on Lyndsey with their son's babysitter, and was referred by Herb to be a "legend" on the street. After Lyndsey's house burns down, Chris reconciles with her, despite Lyndsey forgiving Alan. Several episodes later, Lyndsey breaks up with Chris and makes up with Alan. Alan starts to think Chris is out to get him. Chris and Alan make up and Chris wishes him and Lyndsey the best.
 Missi Pyle (season 2, 7, 9) and Alicia Witt (season 6) as Miss Dolores Pasternak, Jake's school teacher who also dated Charlie.
 Matthew Marsden as Nigel Pierce (season 9), Zoey's ex-husband, the father of Ava. It was never revealed why Zoey and Nigel divorced, but Zoey is shown to despise him, and Nigel reciprocates the feelings. Nigel and Zoey have joint custody of Ava. Nigel and Walden have met on two occasions, and did not get along.
 Georgia Engel as Jean (season 9), Lyndsey's bisexual mother, and Evelyn's newest love interest and roommate. Jean first appears when Alan and Lyndsey take their mothers out to dinner. That night, Evelyn and Jean sleep together and start a lesbian relationship. Evelyn has Jean move in with her in the following episode.
 Miley Cyrus as Missi (season 10), an old family friend of Walden's, who becomes Jake's new girlfriend for a brief time. They break up because Jake had fallen in love with her, and she did not feel the same by the end of episode 7, season 10.
 Jaime Pressly as Tammy (season 10), Jake's ex-fiancée who is twice his age. Jake met Tammy through her parole officer, and ultimately started dating. Tammy has three kids from three different men. For Christmas, Tammy had Jake dress up as all three fathers. Tammy and Jake almost married in Vegas, but they called off the wedding when Tammy told Jake that getting married should be about bringing to families together, not breaking up two families. Jake and Tammy continue to date until the end of the season when Jake cheats on Tammy with her eldest daughter, Ashley (Emily Osment). When Tammy sees how much Jake and Ashley want to be together, Tammy gives them her blessing, only for Ashley's ex to return and propose to Ashley.
 Odette Annable as Nicole (season 11), Walden's love interest and business partner in her start-up high tech company.
 Jeff Probst as himself, Walden and Alan's neighbor (season 11)
 Michael Bolton as himself, a friend of Walden's. He was present when Walden proposed to Zoey, and later when he married Alan, both times singing "When a Man Loves a Woman", albeit the second time changing the lyrics to "When a Man Loves Another Man." (Season 10 and 12.) After the ceremony, he had a ménage à trois with grooms' mothers: Evelyn Harper and Robin Schmitt, to which he sings "When a Man Loves Two Women". He was also present when Walden attempted to reconcile with Ms. McMartin, singing "When a Man Loves His Social Worker" and, after being told to leave and helping himself to the couple's dinner, "When a Man Loves a Cheese Sandwich". He also appeared in a vision Walden had about his future, running off with Ms. McMartin while singing "When a Man Steals a Woman".

References 

 
Lists of American sitcom television characters